Hyo-Jung Kim (born November 6, 1988) is an American short track speed skater. She competed in four events at the 2006 Winter Olympics. Her father Soo-Hong, a construction executive, lived for twelve years in Orange County, California, and naturalized as a U.S. citizen. He returned to South Korea in 1988 due to his job, shortly before Hyo-Jung was born. She grew up in both Seoul and southern California, and did her early training in skating in South Korea before moving to Colorado Springs, Colorado, where she continued her training at the United States Olympic Training Center.

References

External links
 

1988 births
Living people
American female short track speed skaters
Olympic short track speed skaters of the United States
Short track speed skaters at the 2006 Winter Olympics
Speed skaters from Seoul
21st-century American women